The women's heptathlon event at the 2019 Asian Athletics Championships was held on 22 and 23 April.

Medalists

Results

100 metres hurdles
Wind:Heat 1: +0.2 m/s, Heat 2: +0.6 m/s

High jump

Shot put

200 metres
Wind:Heat 1: +1.2 m/s, Heat 2: +1.2 m/s

Long jump

Javelin throw

800 metres

Final standings

References

Heptathlon
Combined events at the Asian Athletics Championships
2019 in women's athletics